Little Manitou Lake is a small saltwater lake about  south-east of Saskatoon in the Canadian province of Saskatchewan. The lake was formed by receding glaciers during the most recent ice age. It is fed by underground springs, and has a mineral content high in sodium, magnesium, and potassium salts due to it being a terminal lake. The salt content of the water (180 g/L) gives it a salinity about half of that of the Dead Sea (300-400 ppt), allowing bathers to float easily.

The lake falls within the Lanigan-Manitou Sub-basin of the Upper Qu'Appelle watershed.

There is no fishing as the high salt content of the water supports little other than brine shrimp.

History 
Since the 19th century, native people have been bringing sick people to the lake they named after the spirit Manitou. The earliest known practice of using this water to heal was when some Assiniboine people afflicted with smallpox were supposedly cured after drinking and submerging themselves in the water.

Since the turn of the 20th century and the depression of the 1930s, Manitou has been a tourist resort due to its unique mineral waters. Since the late 1980s, the claimed health benefits and the buoyancy of the water have once again made it a popular tourist destination.

Manitou Beach has spawned an arts community, made evident by the founding of an Artists' Collective called "Spirit of Manitou Studio Trail". The Spirit of Manitou Studio Trail consists of an open studio / gallery weekend tour including artists/artisans from the localities of Allan, Meacham, Watrous, and Manitou Beach.

Manitou and District Regional Park 
The park is split up into three different spots near the lake. Right beside the campground is the Jubilee Drive-In Theatre, one of only a few left in Saskatchewan. The others include the Prairie Dog Drive-in Theatre in Carlyle, the Clearwater Drive-In in Kyle, the Moonlight Movies Drive-in in Pilot Butte, and the Twilite Drive-In Theater in Wolseley.

In 1931, one of the founding six original provincial parks was founded at the lake. It was called Little Manitou Provincial Park. In 1962, it was changed to a regional park. The founding of the original provincial parks was a plan by the government to get people working during the Great Depression. Several buildings were built, including a natural fieldstone chalet, which was used as a commercial tourist hotel. In the 1950s, the chalet was changed to Camp Easter Seal.

See also 
 List of lakes of Saskatchewan
 Tourism in Saskatchewan
 List of protected areas of Saskatchewan

References

External links 

Lakes of Saskatchewan
Endorheic lakes of Canada
Saline lakes of Canada